Ariel Erin Kaplan (born 4 May 1994) is a South African-born Australian actress, singer and dancer. She is known for her roles as Lisa Atwood in the third season of children's series The Saddle Club and Imogen Willis in the Australian soap opera Neighbours.

Early life
Ariel Erin Kaplan was born in South Africa on 4 May 1994. Kaplan comes from a Jewish family of performers; her father is a musician, her grandfather was an actor and her grandmother was a professional ballerina. Her two older sisters Gemma-Ashley Kaplan and Dena Kaplan are also actresses. Dena Kaplan is best known for her role as Abigail Armstrong on Dance Academy. Aside from acting, Kaplan also had extensive training in dancing and singing. She studied various dance styles such as jazz, contemporary, ballet and tap at the Jane Moore Academy of Ballet in Melbourne from 1998 until 2011. Kaplan was home schooled through distance education.

Career
As a child, Kaplan appeared in several Australian theatre productions, including Joseph and the Amazing Technicolor Dreamcoat, The Sound of Music, Oedipus, Annie and Les Miserables. In 2002 and 2003, she played the role of Florence in IMG's production of Oliver! in both Melbourne and Singapore. Between 2003 and 2004, Kaplan had minor roles in sketch comedy shows Skithouse and The Hamish & Andy Show, and appeared in the short film The Mischief Maker. In 2005 and 2006, she played the role of Young Nala in Disney Theatrical's production of The Lion King for both the Melbourne and Shanghai seasons.

Kaplan's first major television role came in 2007, when she took over the role of Lisa Atwood for the third season of The Saddle Club. The third season was filmed from November 2007 to May 2008, and premiered in March 2009. Kaplan recorded several songs for the show's accompanying album Best Friends. Between 2009 and 2012, she made guest appearances in television shows John Safran's Race Relations and Tangle, and appeared in the theatre production Grey Gardens as Jacqueline Bouvier.

In February 2013, it was announced that Kaplan had joined the cast of the long-running soap opera Neighbours as Imogen Willis. She won the role after a quick audition process, which included one audition and a screen test with cast members Harley Bonner, Rebekah Elmaloglou and Kip Gamblin. Kaplan made her first appearance as Imogen on 20 May 2013. Kaplan left her role as Imogen on 26 April 2016 to pursue other projects Kaplan reprised the role of Imogen on 22 March 2019 for a guest stint.

Filmography

Awards and nominations

References

External links

1994 births
Living people
Jewish Australian actresses
Australian Jews
Australian soap opera actresses
21st-century Australian actresses
Australian female dancers
South African emigrants to Australia
South African Jews
People from Johannesburg
21st-century Australian singers
21st-century Australian women singers